Karl Rüdiger "Purple" Schulz (born 25 September 1956 in Cologne) is a German pop singer. The nickname "Purple" came from covering Deep Purple tunes as a 13-year-old. He had his greatest successes in the 1980s. Some of Purple Schulz's songs are noted for highbrow literary references; his „Sehnsucht“ of 1983 cites the poet Eichendorff's „Sehnsucht.“

Discography (albums) 
 Die Härte – 1982 (as Neue Heimat)
 Hautnah – 1983 (as Neue Heimat, and Purple Schulz und die Neue Heimat)
 Verliebte Jungs – 1985
 Der Stand der Dinge – 1987
 ['tsvai] – 1988
 Purple Schulz – 1990
 haha – 1992
 Die Singles 84 – 92
 Spass beiseite? – 1994
 POP – 1997
 Sehnsucht (Die Balladen 1984–1999) – 1999
 Programmänderung – 2003
 Stunksitzung 2004/2005
 So und nicht anders - 2012
 So ist das live! - 2013
 Der Sing des Lebens - 2017
 Nach wie vor - 2019

References

1956 births
Living people
Musicians from Cologne
German male singers